"A Little Bit of Love" is a song by the American rock band Weezer, released on March 16, 2022, as the first single from the first of their planned 2022 series of four extended plays SZNZ: Spring. The song made its live debut on March 21, 2022, on Jimmy Kimmel Live!.

Critical reception
A Little Bit of Love was positively received by Izzy Colón of Spin, whom described it as "a light and fresh song that builds anticipation for the rest of the project." Mick McStarkey at Far Out Magazine gave the song a rating of 6/10, stating "the quartet has delivered yet another earworm, one that’s brimming with the message of love and unity, a departure from their often ridiculous lyrics." Sowing from Sputnikmusic described the song as "a cutely enjoyable little bop that is designed to put a spring in your step more than actually wow you with any sort of songwriting prowess," and opined that the chorus is an "earworm," while comparing the use of the harmonica to that of their 2016 self-titled album. Sowing rated the song 3 out of 5 stars.

Charts

Weekly charts

Year-end charts

References

2022 singles
2022 songs
Songs written by Rivers Cuomo
Weezer songs